Hem-Behag is a late night (samay) raga in North Indian classical music that was composed by Ustad Baba Allauddin Khan.

Origin
Hem-Behag has principal roots in a more common raga, Bihag. Hem-Behag or Bihag takes aspects of Raga Hemant.  The raga centers around shudha Madhyam (vadi) and Ni (samavadi), but this is variable.

Structure
Arohana:  Ni Sa Ga Ma(shuddh) Pa Ni Sa
Avarohana:  Sa Ni Dha Ma(shudha)Pa Ma Ga Ma Re Sa

Good sources for listening would be:
 
 Ali Akbar Khan & Ravi Shankar  performing an alaap (introduction)  in their live In Concert 1972 album (released 1973 on Apple Records).
 Nikhil Banerjee

References

In Concert 1972 (released 1973, Apple Records), track 1 (Ravi Shankar introduces this raga and attributes it as a composition of Ustad Allaudiin Khan's).

Bihag